Connecticut's 2nd congressional district is a congressional district in the U.S. state of Connecticut. Located in the eastern part of the state, the district includes all of New London County, Tolland County, and Windham County, along with parts of Hartford, Middlesex, and New Haven counties. Principal cities include Enfield, Norwich, New London, and Groton.

The district is currently represented by Democrat Joe Courtney. With a Cook Partisan Voting Index rating of D+3, it is one of the least Democratic districts in Connecticut, a state with an all-Democratic congressional delegation.

Towns in the district

Hartford County – Enfield, Glastonbury (part), Marlborough, and Suffield.

Middlesex County – Chester, Clinton, Deep River, East Haddam, East Hampton, Essex, Haddam, Killingworth, Old Saybrook, and Westbrook.

New Haven County – Madison.

New London County – Bozrah, Colchester, East Lyme, Franklin, Griswold, Groton, Lebanon, Ledyard, Lisbon, Lyme, Montville, New London, North Stonington, Norwich, Old Lyme, Preston, Salem, Sprague, Stonington, Voluntown, and Waterford.

Tolland County – Andover, Bolton, Columbia, Coventry, Ellington, Hebron, Mansfield, Somers, Stafford, Tolland, Union, Vernon, and Willington.

Windham County – Ashford, Brooklyn, Canterbury, Chaplin, Eastford, Hampton, Killingly, Plainfield, Pomfret, Putnam, Scotland, Sterling, Thompson, Windham, and Woodstock.

Voter registration

Recent presidential elections

Recent elections

1992

1994

1996

1998

2000

2002

2004

2006

2008

2010

2012

2014

2016

2018

2020

2022

List of members representing the district 
District organized from Connecticut's At-large congressional district in 1837.

References

 Congressional Biographical Directory of the United States 1774–present

2
Hartford County, Connecticut
Middlesex County, Connecticut
New Haven County, Connecticut
New London County, Connecticut
Tolland County, Connecticut
Windham County, Connecticut
Constituencies established in 1837
1837 establishments in Connecticut